Siddhalek is a rural municipality located within the Dhading District of the Bagmati Province of Nepal. The rural municipality spans , with a total population of 23,729 according to a 2011 Nepal census.

On March 10, 2017, the Government of Nepal restructured the local level bodies into 753 new local level structures. The previous Nalang, Salang, and Kumpur VDCs were merged to form Siddhalek. Siddhalek is divided into 7 wards, with Salang declared the administrative center of the rural municipality.

Demographics
At the time of the 2011 Nepal census, Siddhalek Rural Municipality had a population of 23,729. Of these, 86.4% spoke Nepali, 10.8% Magar, 1.3% Tamang, 0.8% Gurung, 0.2% Ghale, 0.2% Majhi, 0.2% Newar, 0.1% Urdu and 0.1% other languages as their first language.

In terms of ethnicity/caste, 19.6% were Magar, 18.3% Hill Brahmin, 16.5% Newar, 9.5% Sarki, 7.1% Chhetri, 6.2% Ghale, 5.0% Kami, 4.2% Sanyasi/Dasnami, 3.8% Damai/Dholi, 3.2% Gurung, 1.6% Gharti/Bhujel, 1.5% Tamang, 1.3% Majhi, 0.9% Thakuri, 0.6% Brahmu/Baramo, 0.1% Chepang/Praja,, 0.1% Gaine, 0.1% Limbu, 0.1% Musalman, 0.1% Rai, 0.1% other Terai and 0.2% others.

In terms of religion, 94.4% were Hindu, 4.0% Buddhist, 1.4% Christian, 0.1% Muslim and 0.1% others.

In terms of literacy, 64.4% could both read and write, 3.1% could read but not write and 32.5% could neither read nor write.

References

External links
official website of the rural municipality

Rural municipalities in Dhading District
Rural municipalities of Nepal established in 2017